Joseph and Sarah Puterbaugh Farm, also known as Puterbaugh-Haines House, is a historic home located in Concord Township, Elkhart County, Indiana. The house was built about 1860, and is a two-story, three bay, Italianate style brick dwelling with a one-story setback wing.  It has a hipped roof and features a portico supported by square columns.  The property also includes a contributing English bank barn (c. 1850).

It was added to the National Register of Historic Places in 1995.

References

External links

Houses on the National Register of Historic Places in Indiana
Italianate architecture in Indiana
Houses completed in 1860
Houses in Elkhart County, Indiana
National Register of Historic Places in Elkhart County, Indiana